Fragkista, pronounced in Greek Frangista, is a former municipality in Evrytania, Greece. Since the 2011 local government reform it is part of the municipality Agrafa, of which it is a municipal unit. The municipal unit has an area of 177.261 km2. Population 1,547 (2011).

Notable people 
 Georgios Kafantaris (1873–1946), politician

References

Populated places in Evrytania